Curse of the Starving Class is a 1994 American drama film directed by J. Michael McClary and starring James Woods, Kathy Bates, Randy Quaid, Henry Thomas and Louis Gossett Jr.  It is based on Sam Shepard's 1977 play of the same name.  The screenplay was written by Bruce Beresford, who also served as an executive producer.

Cast
James Woods as Weston Tate
Kathy Bates as Ella Tate
Henry Thomas as Wesley Tate
Kristin Fiorella as Emma Tate
Louis Gossett Jr. as Ellis
Randy Quaid as Taylor

References

External links
 
 

American drama films
American films based on plays
Trimark Pictures films
1994 drama films
1994 films
1990s English-language films
1990s American films